Clausicella xanthocera is a species of tachinid flies in the genus Clausicella of the family Tachinidae.

External links

Tachinidae